In enzymology, a pantothenase is an enzyme that catalyzes the chemical reaction

(R)-pantothenate + H2O  (R)-pantoate + beta-alanine

Thus, the two substrates of this enzyme are (R)-pantothenate and H2O, whereas its two products are (R)-pantoate and beta-alanine.

This enzyme belongs to the family of hydrolases, those acting on carbon-nitrogen bonds other than peptide bonds, specifically in linear amides.  The systematic name of this enzyme class is (R)-pantothenate amidohydrolase. Other names in common use include pantothenate hydrolase, and pantothenate amidohydrolase.  This enzyme participates in pantothenate and coa biosynthesis.

References

 

EC 3.5.1
Enzymes of unknown structure